Jason Douglas Black (born August 15, 1972) is an American retired mixed martial artist who competed in the lightweight and welterweight divisions. He is a veteran of the King of the Cage, UFC, and PRIDE Fighting Championships organizations, a former UCC title holder, and trains with the Miletich Fighting Systems camp.

Background
Black was born in Ottumwa, Iowa and began wrestling when he was in the third grade. He moved to Bettendorf, Iowa and then began making the transition to mixed martial arts.

Mixed martial arts career

Early career
Black had a very successful start to his career, holding a record of 12-0 in small organizations such as SuperBrawl in Hawaii, Extreme Challenge, and HOOKnSHOOT with many of the wins coming in the first round. Black then fought future MFC Lightweight Champion Antonio McKee at World Fighting Alliance 1. The two fought to a draw.

Black continued his dominance, holding a record of 21-0-1 with wins over Ivan Menjivar, John Alessio, and Keith Wisniewski, before making his King of the Cage debut. Black fought against former WEC Welterweight Champion Shonie Carter and was given his first professional loss via TKO due to punches and to this date is the only TKO or KO loss of Black's career. Black then fought for Japan's PRIDE organization before being given a UFC contract.

Ultimate Fighting Championship
Black made his debut with the Ultimate Fighting Championship at UFC Fight Night 10, losing to Thiago Tavares by triangle choke. He then lost at UFC 77 to Matt Grice by split decision after a very close fight that was originally ruled a draw when the score was incorrectly read. Black subsequently retired following the defeat.

Personal life
Black is married and has two children.

Championships and accomplishments
Ultimate Fighting Championship
Fight of the Night (One time) vs. Matt Grice

Mixed martial arts record

|-
| Loss
| align=center| 23–4–1
| Matt Grice
| Decision (split)
| UFC 77
| 
| align=center| 3
| align=center| 5:00
| Cincinnati, Ohio, United States
| 
|-
| Loss
| align=center| 23–3–1
| Thiago Tavares
| Submission (triangle choke)
| UFC Fight Night: Stout vs Fisher
| 
| align=center| 2
| align=center| 2:49
| Hollywood, Florida, United States
| 
|-
| Win
| align=center| 23–2–1
| Sam Jackson
| Submission (choke)
| EC 74 - Extreme Challenge 74
| 
| align=center| N/A
| align=center| N/A
| Iowa City, Iowa, United States
| 
|-
| Loss
| align=center| 22–2–1
| Shinya Aoki
| Submission (triangle choke)
| Pride - Bushido 12
| 
| align=center| 1
| align=center| 1:58
| Nagoya, Aichi, Japan
| 
|-
| Win
| align=center| 22–1–1
| Jin Eoh
| TKO (corner stoppage)
| Pride - Bushido 11
| 
| align=center| 1
| align=center| 4:25
| Saitama, Japan
| 
|-
| Loss
| align=center| 21–1–1
| Shonie Carter
| TKO (punches)
| KOTC: Redemption on the River
| 
| align=center| 1
| align=center| 1:18
| Moline, Illinois, United States
| 
|-
| Win
| align=center| 21–0–1
| Kyle Jensen
| Submission (triangle choke)
| EC 64 - Extreme Challenge 64
| 
| align=center| 1
| align=center| 1:15
| Osceola, Iowa, United States
| 
|-
| Win
| align=center| 20–0–1
| Keith Wisniewski
| Decision (unanimous)
| XKK - Xtreme Kage Kombat
| 
| align=center| 3
| align=center| 5:00
| Des Moines, Iowa, United States
| 
|-
| Win
| align=center| 19–0–1
| Gideon Ray
| Decision (unanimous)
| IHC 7 - The Crucible
| 
| align=center| 3
| align=center| 5:00
| Hammond, Indiana, United States
| 
|-
| Win
| align=center| 18–0–1
| Marcel Perigold
| Submission (armbar)
| EC 53 - Extreme Challenge 53
| 
| align=center| 1
| align=center| 1:08
| Iowa City, Iowa, United States
| 
|-
| Win
| align=center| 17–0–1
| Michael Johnston
| Submission (north-south choke)
| EF 1 - Genesis
| 
| align=center| 1
| align=center| 1:35
| London, England
| 
|-
| Win
| align=center| 16–0–1
| John Alessio
| Decision (split)
| UCC 12 - Adrenaline
| 
| align=center| 3
| align=center| 5:00
| Montreal, Quebec, Canada
| 
|-
| Win
| align=center| 15–0–1
| Chad W. Saunders
| TKO (retirement)
| WFA 3: Level 3
| 
| align=center| 2
| align=center| 5:00
| Las Vegas, Nevada, United States
| 
|-
| Win
| align=center| 14–0–1
| Ivan Menjivar
| Submission (rear-naked choke)
| UCC 8 - Fast and Furious
| 
| align=center| 1
| align=center| 3:33
| Rimouski, Quebec, Canada
| 
|-
| Win
| align=center| 13–0–1
| James Meals
| TKO (punches)
| EC 46 - Extreme Challenge 46
| 
| align=center| 1
| align=center| 1:44
| Clive, Iowa, United States
| 
|-
| Draw
| align=center| 12–0–1
| Antonio McKee
| Draw (split)
| World Fighting Alliance 1
| 
| align=center| 3
| align=center| 5:00
| Las Vegas, Nevada, United States
| 
|-
| Win
| align=center| 12–0
| Jeremiah Billington
| Submission (arm-triangle choke)
| IC 3 - Iowa Challenge 3
| 
| align=center| 2
| align=center| 0:45
| Waterloo, Iowa, United States
| 
|-
| Win
| align=center| 11–0
| Cedric Marks
| Submission (elbows)
| EC 42 - Extreme Challenge 42
| 
| align=center| 1
| align=center| 3:03
| Davenport, Iowa, United States
| 
|-
| Win
| align=center| 10–0
| John Cronk
| TKO (punches)
| IC 2 - Iowa Challenge 2
| 
| align=center| 2
| align=center| 3:11
| Cedar Rapids, Iowa, United States
| 
|-
| Win
| align=center| 9–0
| Eddie Miller
| Submission (guillotine choke)
| HOOKnSHOOT - Masters
| 
| align=center| 1
| align=center| 0:19
| Evansville, Indiana, United States
| 
|-
| Win
| align=center| 8–0
| Jake Hudson
| Submission (punches)
| Gladiators 14 - Gladiators 14
| 
| align=center| 1
| align=center| N/A
| Omaha, Nebraska, United States
| 
|-
| Win
| align=center| 7–0
| Jeremy Bennett
| Submission (guillotine choke)
| Superbrawl - Futurebrawl 2000
| 
| align=center| 1
| align=center| 3:23
| Honolulu, Hawaii, United States
| 
|-
| Win
| align=center| 6–0
| Brian Anthony Fulton
| Submission (arm-triangle choke)
| EC 36 - Extreme Challenge 36
| 
| align=center| 1
| align=center| 6:35
| Davenport, Iowa, United States
| 
|-
| Win
| align=center| 5–0
| Bobby Clayton
| align=center| N/A
| Gladiators 8 - Gladiators 8
| 
| align=center| N/A
| align=center| N/A
| United States
| 
|-
| Win
| align=center| 4–0
| Don Hamilton
| align=center| N/A
| Gladiators 8 - Gladiators 8
| 
| align=center| N/A
| align=center| N/A
| United States
| 
|-
| Win
| align=center| 3–0
| Don Hamilton
| align=center| N/A
| Gladiators 7 - Gladiators 7
| 
| align=center| N/A
| align=center| N/A
| United States
| 
|-
| Win
| align=center| 2–0
| Bobby Clayton
| align=center| N/A
| Gladiators 7 - Gladiators 7
| 
| align=center| N/A
| align=center| N/A
| United States
| 
|-
| Win
| align=center| 1–0
| Steve Berger
| Decision (split)
| EC 32 - Extreme Challenge 32
| 
| align=center| 1
| align=center| 15:00
| Springfield, Illinois, United States
|

References

External links

 

American male mixed martial artists
Mixed martial artists from Iowa
Lightweight mixed martial artists
Mixed martial artists utilizing taekwondo
Mixed martial artists utilizing wrestling
Mixed martial artists utilizing Brazilian jiu-jitsu
1972 births
Living people
People from Ottumwa, Iowa
American practitioners of Brazilian jiu-jitsu
People awarded a black belt in Brazilian jiu-jitsu
American male taekwondo practitioners
Sportspeople from Davenport, Iowa
People from Bettendorf, Iowa
Ultimate Fighting Championship male fighters